Trikal  (Past, Present and Future) is a 1985 Indian movie written and directed by Shyam Benegal, set in Goa during the twilight of Portuguese rule, It marked the return of Leela Naidu in her first film appearance since 1969.

The film was selected for the Indian Panorama at Filmotsav 1986, and for the Indian Film Retrospective, Lisbon 1986. It was later invited to the London Film Festival 1986.

Plot summary 
Set in the Portuguese Goa in 1961 shortly before the colony's liberation by the Indian army and shown in the form of flashbacks, Anna Souza-Suarez (Sushma Prakash) is unwillingly engaged to a young man named Erasmo (Lucky Ali) when her grandfather Ernesto suddenly dies. The engagement is put on hold indefinitely as Anna's grief stricken grandmother, Dona Maria (Leela Naidu), the matriarch of the family  attempts to hold seances to contact Ernesto with the help of her maid Milagrinia (Neena Gupta), acting as a medium. However, the seances bring forth the apparitions of various people the family has wronged in the past. Shortly after a visitation by a spirit of an Indian rebel beheaded by Dona Maria's grandfather in a case of mistaken identity. Leon (Dalip Tahil), Anna's lover, a fugitive is hidden in the cellar of the family home. Anna soon discovers the fact she is pregnant by Leon and unsuccessfully tries to hide the fact she had an affair from Erasmo. Ruiz, who had attempted to pursue Anna in the past, begins a secret relationship with Milagrinia who becomes pregnant as well. Anna elopes with Leon to Europe leaving only a letter behind. Milagrinia also gets married to an older man in an attempt to make sure the child isn't born out of wedlock. After twenty four years, Ruiz comes back to the ancestral home which is now in ruins from years of neglect and ponders the reasons that brought him back to the home.

The movie ends with Naseeruddin Shah’s monologue which actually questions the  action of characters within the movie including his. He wonders what brought him back after so many years. Was it the grand manor? Or Dona Maria? Or Anna? Or was it, in fact, Milagrenia, who in his view was only a servant and a commodity that was reared as fodder for use by others? He then reconciles with himself and his past by questioning how long can a criminal carry the guilt of a past crime? Everything fades under layers of time and all that remains is sweet memory.

Cast
 Leela Naidu as Dona Maria Souza-Soares
Naseeruddin Shah as Ruiz Pereira
Nikhil Bhagat as Young Ruiz Pereira
Anita Kanwar as Sylvia
 Neena Gupta as Milagrenia
 Soni Razdan as Aurora, Sylvia's elder daughter
 Dalip Tahil as Leon Gonsalves
 K. K. Raina as Senor Lucio
 Kunal Kapoor as Kapitan Ribeiro/ Governor
 Keith Stevenson as Dr. Simon Pereira
 Lucky Ali as  Erasmo
 Salim Ghouse as main priest at Church
 Ila Arun as Cook
 Jayant Kripalani as Francis
 Akash Khurana as Renato
 Sabira Merchant as Dona Amelia
 Sushma Prakash as Anna, younger daughter of Sylvia
 Remo Fernandes as Singer
 Alisha Chinai as Singer
 Kulbhushan Kharbanda as Vijay Singh Rane/Khushtoba Rane
 Dhruv Ghanekar as young son of Sylvia
 Joy Ghanekar as youngest son of Sylvia

Awards
 1986: National Film Award for Best Direction: Shyam Benegal
 1986: National Film Award for Best Costume Design: Saba Zaidi

References

External links
 

1985 films
1980s Hindi-language films
Films directed by Shyam Benegal
Films set in Goa
Films whose director won the Best Director National Film Award
Films set in 1961
Films shot in Goa
Films scored by Vanraj Bhatia
Films that won the Best Costume Design National Film Award